Broxburn Football Club was a football club from Broxburn in West Lothian.

History
The club was formed in 1902 as a "resuscitation" of the previous Broxburn F.C. senior club, which had ceased operations in 1894.  The club's first match was against Mossend Swifts F.C. on 15 March 1902 and included a number of players who had played for the previous incarnation.

The club entered the Scottish Cup via the qualifying competition from 1902 to 1911.  The only time the club made it to the first round proper was in 1908–09, when it was drawn to play Beith F.C. in the first round.  The match required four replays before it was finally decided in favour of Beith, the final tie taking place at Love Street, the ground of St Mirren F.C., on 5 February 1909, the day before the tie's winners were to play the Buddies in the second round.

The club was however successful locally.  It was a three-time winner of the Linlithgowshire Cup, and also won the City Cup in 1909–10, albeit that competition by then was restricted to four clubs (the others being Leith Athletic, St Bernards, and West Calder Swifts).

At the start of April 1912, the club and Broxburn Athletic agreed to a merger, the new club to be called Broxburn United.  The last match for the clubs was the final of the Gardeners' Cup (a charity invitational competition of long standing), won by Broxburn; a week later for Athletics players played for Broxburn against Rangers in a friendly "with a view to testing their qualifications for 'The United'".

Colours

The club originally played in white jerseys, changing to blue in 1910.

Ground

The club's first home ground was Crow Park, on Station Road.  This was a distance from the town centre and in 1904 the club obtained support from local businessmen to restore the old ground at Sports Field, the pitch being 112 yards x 60 yards, and with a cycling track around it.  The first match at Sports Field was a 2–1 win over Hearts of Beath F.C. in the East of Scotland Cup qualifying section, on 17 September; the tie had originally been played at Shamrock Park, because Sports Field was not ready, but Hearts of Beath protested the defeat on the basis that Shamrock Park had not been registered as Broxburn's home ground.

References

Defunct football clubs in Scotland
Association football clubs established in 1902
Association football clubs disestablished in 1912
Football in West Lothian
1902 establishments in Scotland
1912 disestablishments in Scotland